William Raven (1756–1814) was an English master mariner, naval officer and merchant.  He commanded the whaler and sealing vessel Britannia and the naval store ship  in Australian and New Zealand waters from 1792 until 1799. While in command of Britannia under contract to the British East India Company, he mapped the Loyalty Islands of Maré, Lifou, Tiga and  Ouvéa between August 1793 and May 1796.

Raven was granted  of land in the vicinity of Tennyson Point, New South Wales in 1795, plus another  in 1799. The grant was known as Grove Farm.  These Eastern Farms, now Kissing Point, properties were managed for him by the brewer James Squire of Kissing Point until Squire's death in 1822. The tip of the peninsula into the Parramatta River at Tennyson Point is now called Raven Point.

References

1756 births
1814 deaths
English explorers of the Pacific
Sealers
British people in whaling
Sea captains